Joaquim da Silva Carvalho (18 April 1937 – 5 April 2022) was a Portuguese footballer who played as a goalkeeper.

Club career
Born in Barreiro, Setúbal District, Carvalho started playing football with local Luso Futebol Clube, transferring in 1958 to Sporting CP where he remained the following 12 years, winning five major titles. He was in goal as the Lisbon side defeated MTK Budapest to conquer the 1963–64 edition of the UEFA Cup Winners' Cup.

Carvalho appeared in 251 matches with his main club, friendlies included. He retired in 1972 at the age of 35 after a spell with neighbouring Atlético Clube de Portugal, subsequently returning to Sporting as a goalkeeper coach.

International career
Carvalho played six times with the Portugal national team, making his debut on 31 October 1965 in a 0–0 draw with Czechoslovakia in the 1966 FIFA World Cup qualifying campaign. Selected for the finals in England, he featured in the opener against Hungary (3–1 win in Manchester) but lost his place to C.F. Os Belenenses' José Pereira for the remainder of the tournament, with the country finishing in third place.

Death
Carvalho died on 5 April 2022, thirteen days shy of his 85th birthday.

Honours
Sporting CP
Primeira Liga: 1961–62, 1965–66, 1969–70
Taça de Portugal: 1962–63
UEFA Cup Winners' Cup: 1963–64

Portugal
FIFA World Cup third place: 1966

References

External links

1937 births
2022 deaths
Sportspeople from Barreiro, Portugal
Portuguese footballers
Association football goalkeepers
Primeira Liga players
Liga Portugal 2 players
Sporting CP footballers
Atlético Clube de Portugal players
Portugal international footballers
1966 FIFA World Cup players